Épinay may refer to the following communes in France:

Épinay, Eure, in the Eure département
Épinay-Champlâtreux, in the Val-d'Oise département
Épinay-sous-Sénart, in the Essonne département
Épinay-sur-Duclair in the Seine-Maritime département
Épinay-sur-Odon, in the Calvados département
Épinay-sur-Orge, in the Essonne département
Épinay-sur-Seine, in the Seine-Saint-Denis département
L'Épinay-le-Comte, in the Orne département
Cartigny-l'Épinay, in the Calvados département
Saint-Aubin-Épinay, in the Seine-Maritime département

See also
Epinay Congress